"Defuera" is a song by Dardust featuring vocals from Ghali, Madame and Marracash. It was released on 15 July 2020 by Island Records.

Music video
The music video for "Defuera", directed by YouNuts! and Bendo, premiered on 17 July 2020 via Durdust's YouTube channel.

Charts

Certifications

References

2020 songs
2020 singles
Island Records singles
Songs written by Dario Faini
Madame (singer) songs
Songs written by Davide Petrella